One Night Only is a 2016 Chinese-Taiwanese crime romantic drama film directed by Matt Wu. This is Wu's feature film directorial debut, and stars Aaron Kwok, Yang Zishan (Wu's wife), Hao Lei, Andy On and Jack Kao. It was released in China by Heng Ye Film Distribution on July 22, 2016.

Plot
Having lost all his fortune and loved ones from gambling, Gao Ye walks out from prison to an even more cruel world. Intrigued by a beautiful hooker who approaches him for unknown reasons, he comes up with a master plan to redeem everything he once had. But things immediately spin wildly out of control as they find themselves fallen into a bigger scheme set up by the underground. Will they survive this one night to see another sunrise?

Cast
Aaron Kwok
Yang Zishan
Hao Lei
Andy On
Jack Kao
Zhou Yutong
Li Haofei
Jessie Li
Fan Tiantian

Reception
The film has grossed  in China.

References

External links
 
 Review of One Night Only, with an interview with Matt Wu

Chinese romantic drama films
Chinese crime drama films
Taiwanese romantic drama films
2010s romance films
2016 directorial debut films